carpal branch of the ulnar artery may refer to:

 Dorsal carpal branch of the ulnar artery
 Palmar carpal branch of ulnar artery